Electric Café is the ninth studio album by German electronic band Kraftwerk, released on 10 November 1986. The initial 1986 release came in versions sung in English and German, as well as a limited Edición Española release, featuring versions of "Techno Pop" and "Sex Object" with only Spanish lyrics. It was the first Kraftwerk LP to be created using predominantly digital musical instruments, although the finished product was still recorded onto analog master tapes.

On 2 October 2009, the album was remastered and re-released under its original working title, Techno Pop.

Background and development
The development of the album began in early 1982 (with the working titles of Technicolor and then Techno Pop), but the project was delayed because Ralf Hütter suffered a cycling accident in May or June 1982.

EMI Records announced a release date for the Techno Pop album. Promotional advertisements were released and official catalog numbers were assigned to the project. "We were working on an album concept, Technopop, but the composition was developed and we just changed the titles", Hütter explained. "It became Electric Café. But somebody within the record company went out and did a pre-order, we were working on the sleeve and some marketing idiot did this".

At various times, Hütter, Bartos, Flür and Schneider have each stated in interviews that there are no unreleased songs from this period, and that all of the original Technicolor and Techno Pop material was eventually reworked into what can be heard on the finished Electric Café album. Hütter commented "We don't spend our time on making 20 versions of a song only to leave 19 in the closet. We work target related. What we are starting we release. Our storage is empty."

Composition

The first side of the album is divided into three tracks, which form a suite of three variations with recurring elements. (For instance, a few bars of melody from "Musique Non-Stop" can be heard as a few bars of bass melody in "Techno Pop"). It is primarily instrumental, utilizing the track titles and other phrases in a spoken manner, as opposed to sung, narrative lyrics. The songs "Techno Pop" and "Sex Object" feature partial Spanish-language lyrics. The second side also contains three songs, following a somewhat more conventional pop format.

The song "The Telephone Call" (German version: "Der Telefon-Anruf") is notable for being the first and only Kraftwerk song to feature Karl Bartos on lead vocals. The album closes with the title track "Electric Café", which features French and partially Italian-language lyrics. The track gained some exposure in the United States when it was used slightly sped up as the theme song for "Sprockets", the German television spoof by Mike Myers on Saturday Night Live.

Reception

While recognising Kraftwerk's influence on groups such as Depeche Mode and the Human League, journalist Ian Cranna writing in Smash Hits described the album as "frankly rather dull" adding "one can only assume it's an exercise for their own amusement". Drowned in Sound in his review of the 2009 remaster wrote that "Techno Pop can only be seen as a flop, despite the intermittent brilliance of its opening section." Jason Ankeny of All Music in his retrospective review of the album commented that «the record's short running time (less than 36 minutes) seems to indicate a lack of ideas and new directions with the spartan opening tracks, "Technopop" and "Music Non-Stop."»

Re-issues
A remastered edition of Electric Café was released by EMI Records, Mute Records and Astralwerks Records on CD, digital download and heavyweight vinyl in October–November 2009. The release was changed back to the original title of Techno Pop. Due to licensing restrictions imposed by Warner Music Group, this version has only been made available in the US and Canada as a part of The Catalogue box set.

Track listing

Electric Café (1986)

Notes

Techno Pop (2009)

Notes

Personnel
The original 1986 sleeve notes are, like those in Computer World, unspecific regarding the specific roles of personnel. The 2009 remaster credits provide the following information:

Kraftwerk
Ralf Hütter – voice, vocoder, keyboards, electronics
Florian Schneider – vocoder, speech synthesis, electronics
Karl Bartos – electronic drums; vocals on "The Telephone Call"

Band member Wolfgang Flür is included in a subsequent general list of personnel, but is not credited with a musical or production role in these recordings.

Technical
Henning Schmitz – engineer (Kling Klang Studio)
Joachim Dehmann – engineer (Kling Klang Studio)
Fred Maher – music data transfer (Axis Studio, NYC)
Bill Miranda – music data transfer
François Kevorkian – mixing (Right Track, NYC)
Ralf Hütter – mixing (Right Track, NYC), original artwork reconstruction, album concept, production
Ron St. Germain – mixing (Right Track, NYC)
Bob Ludwig – mastering
Rebecca Allen – computer graphics
Steve Di Paola – computer graphics
Robert McDermott – computer graphics
Amber Denker – computer graphics
Peter Oppenheimer – computer graphics
Hubert Kretzschmar – design
Johann Zambryski – original artwork reconstruction
Florian Schneider – album concept, production

Charts

References

External links

1986 albums
EMI Records albums
German-language albums
Kraftwerk albums
Warner Records albums
Albums recorded at MSR Studios